Paramicrolaimidae is a family of nematodes belonging to the order Leptolaimida.

Genera:
 Paramicrolaimus Wieser, 1954

References

Nematodes